Spirit Soldier rebellions could refer to the following events in China:

 Spirit Soldier rebellions (1920–1926), centered in Hubei and Sichuan
 Spirit Soldier rebellions (1926–1930s) in coordination with Communist uprisings in Hubei, Sichuan, Henan, and Guizhou
 Spirit Soldier rebellion (1959), an anti-Communist uprising in Sizhuang, Henan